New Somerset is an unincorporated community in northern Knox Township, Jefferson County, Ohio, United States.

New Somerset is part of the Weirton–Steubenville, WV-OH Metropolitan Statistical Area.

History
Baltzer Culp was one of the first white settlers in the township, arriving in 1800. He laid out New Somerset in February 1816, making it the oldest community in the township. The first church was established in 1836 by Rev. Joshua Monroe at the north end of the community, and a second in 1840. A post office called New Somerset was established on April 10, 1851, and the community had a population of 77 in 1870, the largest it ever grew. The community slowly faded over time, and the post office was ultimately discontinued on December 14, 1907.

Geography

References

Unincorporated communities in Jefferson County, Ohio